Eve in Exile is a 1919 American silent drama film directed by Burton George based upon a novel by Cosmo Hamilton. It stars stage actress Charlotte Wallker and was distributed by Pathe Exchange.

The film is preserved in the Library of Congress collection.

Plot
As described in a film magazine, when financial ruin overtakes her father, Eve Ricardo (Walker) is sent to live with an aunt in a small town in New England. Here she meets and falls in love with Paul Armitage (Oakman), an author, who returns her affection. However, John Sheen (Santschi) has also fallen in love with Eve and resolves to take any measures necessary to win her. His sister, Mrs. Nina Carey (Palmer), feels the same way about Paul. This leads to various complications.

Cast
Charlotte Walker as Eve Ricardo
Thomas Santschi as John Sheen
Wheeler Oakman as Paul Armitage
Melbourne MacDowell as George Armitage
Violet Palmer as Mrs. Nina Carey
Martha Mattox as Elizabeth Kekewich
George Periolat as Jim Ricardo
Harvey Clark as Easter Monday
Lee Shumway as Dr. Courtland
Perry Banks as Simon Bean

References

External links

1919 films
Films based on British novels
American Film Company films
Silent American drama films
1919 drama films
American silent feature films
American black-and-white films
Pathé Exchange films
Films directed by Burton George
1910s American films